Wheelchair basketball at the 1976 Summer Paralympics consisted of men's and women's team events.

Medal summary 

Source: Paralympic.org

See also
Basketball at the 1976 Summer Olympics

References 

 

1976 Summer Paralympics events
1976
1976 in basketball
International basketball competitions hosted by Canada